Lot and His Daughters is a 1622 oil on canvas painting of Lot and his daughters by Orazio Gentileschi, now in the Gemäldegalerie, Berlin.

Description
In this scene, Lot is represented, drunk of the wine from a jug that rests fallen in the lower left of the painting. Lot rests, with his legs bare, on one of his daughters, who points to the horizon, where can be seen the smoke produced by the destruction of the cities condemned by God. The other daughter also appears half-naked like her father, with her back to the viewer.

Seven different versions
Articles about the other versions of this painting are:
 Lot and His Daughters (Orazio Gentileschi, Los Angeles), 1622 (right daughter with yellow dress)
 Lot and His Daughters (Orazio Gentileschi, Madrid), 1621-1623 (right daughter with yellow dress, painted by his assistants)
 Lot and His Daughters (Orazio Gentileschi, Bilbao), 1628 (cave ceiling with a hole, jug to the right, Lot's wife and lake on the background)

References

1622 paintings
Paintings by Orazio Gentileschi
Collections of the Gemäldegalerie Alte Meister
Paintings of Lot (biblical person)